The Church of Nuestra Señora de la Asunción (Spanish: Iglesia de Nuestra Señora de la Asunción) is a church located in Tobarra, Spain. It was declared Bien de Interés Cultural in 2000.

References 

Nuestra Senora de la Asuncion (Tobarra)
Bien de Interés Cultural landmarks in the Province of Albacete